This is the order of battle of the Turkish Army in June 1941. The formation named 941-A Seferî Kuruluş was as follows:

First Army (Istanbul, Commander: Fahrettin Altay)
Thrace Area
X Corps (Kırklareli)
46th Infantry Division
K.Gr.
2nd Cavalry Division (elements reported at Lüleburgaz in 1935)
Independent Armored Brigade
26th Infantry Brigade
Kırklareli Brigade
Çatalca Area
XX Corps
23rd Infantry Division
24th Infantry Division
33rd Infantry Division
52nd Infantry Division
IV Corps (Çatalca)
8th Infantry Division
22nd Infantry Division
28th Infantry Division
64th Infantry Division
Çatalca Fortified Area Command
III Corps (Çorlu)
1st Infantry Division
61st Infantry Division
46th Infantry Division
62nd Infantry Division
Istanbul and Bosporus Area
Istanbul Command
11th Infantry Division
Bosporus Fortified Area Command

Second Army (Balıkesir, Commander: Abdurrahman Nafiz Gürman)
Dardanelles and Marmara Area
II Corps (Gelibolu)
4th Infantry Division
69th Infantry Division
32nd Infantry Division
66th Infantry Division
72nd Infantry Brigade
Demirkapı Fortified Area Command
I Corps (Çanakkale)
16th Infantry Division
57th Infantry Division
Dardanelles Fortified Area Command
V Corps (Bursa)
5th Infantry Division
6th Infantry Division
25th Infantry Division
Aegean and Mediterranean coasts
XII Corps (İzmir) (1945 Gen. Nuri Berköz took command)
70th Infantry Division
71st Infantry Division
63rd Infantry Division
İzmir Fortified Area Command
Antalya Brigade

Third Army (Erzincan, Commander: Kâzım Orbay)
Eastern Area
IX Corps (Sarıkamış)
9th Infantry Division
3rd Infantry Division
29th Infantry Division
1st Cavalry Division
Erzurum Fortified Area Command
VIII Corps (Merzifon)
12th Infantry Division
15th Infantry Division
VII Corps (Diyarbakır)
2nd Infantry Division
10th Infantry Division
53rd Infantry Division
XVIII Corps (Kars)
48th Infantry Division
51st Infantry Division
67th Infantry Division
Kars Fortified Area Command

Under the direct control of the General Staff (Ankara, Fevzi Çakmak)
Kocaeli Area
VI Corps (Kocaeli)
7th Infantry Division
41st Infantry Division
17th Infantry Division
Syrian Border
XVII Corps (Maraş)
20th Infantry Division
39th Infantry Division
14th Cavalry Division
68th Infantry Brigade

Sources 

Order of battle
Turkish Army
Turkish military-related lists